Bürentsogt Tungsten Mine  ) is a  former mine (closed around 2009) and a settlement in Mönkhkhaan sum (district) of Sükhbaatar Province in eastern Mongolia. This mine is 41 km SW from sum center .

Tungsten production was mainly by a joint venture of Mongolia and the former East Germany.

Tungsten artisanal mining is present

References

Tungsten mines in Mongolia